Marco Tamberi (born 30 July 1958 in Ancona) is a retired Italian high jumper and coach of his son, the Olympic champion Gianmarco Tamberi.

Biography
His personal best jump is 2.27 metres, achieved in June 1983 in Udine. He had 2.28 metres on the indoor track, achieved in February 1983 in Genova. Tamberi is the coach of his son, Gianmarco Tamberi, who won the bronze medal at the 2011 European Athletics Junior Championships in the high jump event.
 He has 11 caps in national team from 1980 to 1984.

National records
 High jump: 2.28 m ( Genoa, 2 February 1983)

Achievements

National titles
He has won one time the individual national championship.
1 win in high jump indoor (1980)

See also
 Gianmarco Tamberi

References

External links
 
 Marco Tamberi at The-Sports.org

1957 births
Living people
Sportspeople from Ancona
Italian male high jumpers
Athletes (track and field) at the 1980 Summer Olympics
Olympic athletes of Italy
Italian athletics coaches